Monterey Festival may refer to:

Monterey Jazz Festival, an annual jazz festival in Monterey, California
Monterey International Pop Festival, a 1967 music festival in Monterey
Monterey Festival of Speed, a motersport event in Monterey; see WeatherTech Raceway Laguna Seca